Ettore Antonio Licheri (born 11 October 1963) is an Italian politician, currently serving as the leader of the Five Star Movement in the Senate.

See also 

 List of current Italian senators

References 

Living people
1963 births
Five Star Movement politicians
Senators of Legislature XVIII of Italy
21st-century Italian politicians